Montpellier is a settlement on the island of Saint Croix in the United States Virgin Islands.

History

In the colonial Danish West Indies period, Montpeillier was a sugar plantation.

References

Populated places in Saint Croix, U.S. Virgin Islands
Plantations in the Danish West Indies